The Temple of Venus is a 1923 American silent fantasy romance film directed by Henry Otto. It stars William Walling, Mary Philbin, and Mickey McBan. It was produced by William Fox and released by his Fox Film Corporation.

Plot
The fantasy has a modern theme and mythological sequences involving shots of beaches with flimsy gowned dancers and imaginative caverns where dwell Venus, Neptune, Jupiter and the rest of the gods. There is also some views of wild life such as seals and tropical birds.

Cast

Production
On location filming was conducted at Santa Cruz Island, California. Jean Arthur was initially cast as the lead, but was replaced by the more experienced Mary Philbin after a few days of rehearsal.

Preservation
With no prints of The Temple of Venus located in any film archive, it is a lost film.

See also
1937 Fox vault fire

References

External links

1923 films
American silent feature films
Lost American films
Fox Film films
Films directed by Henry Otto
American black-and-white films
1920s American films